Connecticut's 75th House of Representatives district elects one member of the Connecticut House of Representatives. It encompasses parts of Waterbury and has been represented by Democrat Geraldo Reyes since 2016.

Recent elections

2020

2018

2016

2014

2012

References

75